Erismadelphus is a genus of flowering plants belonging to the family Vochysiaceae.

Its native range is Southern Nigeria to Western Central Tropical Africa.

Species
Species:

Erismadelphus exsul 
Erismadelphus sessilis

References

Vochysiaceae
Myrtales genera